Brynner usually refers to Yul Brynner, the stage name of Russian-born American actor born Yuliy Borisovich Briner (1920–1985). It may also refer to:

 Carlos Brynner, Argentine discus thrower, gold medalist at the 1987 South American Championships in Athletics and the 1982 Southern Cross Games
 Irena Brynner (1917–2003), Russian-born American sculptor, jewelry designer, mezzo-soprano singer and author, cousin of Yul Brynner
 Lord Brynner, stage name of Trinidadian calypso singer Kade Simon (c. 1937–1985)

See also
 Brenner (disambiguation)